Dale Van Johnson (February 4, 1927 – July 19, 1959) was an American racing driver from Greeley, Colorado.

Johnson competed in the United States Auto Club National Championship from 1956 to 1959, making six starts. He also failed to qualify or crashed in practice in eleven more race attempts, including the Indianapolis 500 in 1958 and 1959. He captured his first and only race win in his sixth race start in June 1959 at the famed Langhorne Speedway.

A month later in his next race, Johnson was killed in a third-lap crash in a Non-Championship race at Williams Grove Speedway where his car was either rammed from the side by that of Joe Barzda or the wheels of their cars became entangled. Barzda's car had suffered a reported stuck throttle when entering the third turn and, after making contact, flipped over just as Johnson's. While Barzda escaped with minor injuries, Johnson died of a skull fracture and other injuries or a broken neck.

Johnson's Vargo Special was the same racer in which Dick Linder had perished a few months earlier and in which Hugh Randall would be killed three years later.

At the time of his death Johnson was reported to be a resident of Pittsburgh, Pennsylvania and a former resident of Anaheim, California, Bally, Pennsylvania, where he had moved about three years before his death, and Norristown, Pennsylvania.

Complete USAC Championship Car results

References

External links
Van Johnson at Champ Car Stats

1927 births
1959 deaths
People from Greeley, Colorado
People from Berks County, Pennsylvania
Racing drivers from Colorado
Racing drivers from Pennsylvania
Racing drivers who died while racing
Sports deaths in Pennsylvania